is a Japanese actor.

Filmography

TV Drama
Nobunaga KING OF ZIPANGU (1992) – Oda Nobuyuki (young) 
(Drama Ai no Uta) Oguri no ko (1998)
(Drama Ai no Uta) Maboroshi no Pen Friend (2001)
武蔵 MUSASHI  (2003)
Kamen Rider 555 (2003) – Kobayashi Yoshio/Rabbit Orphnoch (ep. 24-25)
Ultra Q: Dark Fantasy (2004) (episode 11)  
Ultraman Nexus (2005) – Ren Senjyu
Hagure keijijunjouha (2005)
Shin Kaze no Rondo (2006) 
Kamen Rider Kabuto (2006-2007) – Shun Kageyama/Kamen Rider TheBee 2/Kamen Rider PunchHopper
Kamen Rider Decade (2009) – Shun Kageyama/Kamen Rider PunchHopper (Voice in Ep.2 and Ep.3)
Kamen Rider Zi-O (2019) – Shun Kageyama (Worm)/Kamen Rider PunchHopper (episodes 37 and 38)

Movies
Kamen Rider Den-O: I'm Born! (2007) – Salamander Imagin (voice)
Bokura no Ai no Kanade (2007)

External links
Profile
Official blog

Japanese male actors
Living people
1986 births